Kierkegaardian Studies is a book about Søren Kierkegaard by philosopher Jean Wahl, originally published in 1938 in Paris, France. Its publication marked a significant turning-point in French philosophy, which formally introduced and disseminated Kierkegaard's philosophy to France. 

Kierkegaardian Studies was one of the first French studies of Kierkegaard to treat him as a coherent philosopher and theologian, and raised questions that became central to Kierkegaard studies and to Existentialism in general. Before Wahl's book, very few people in France knew much about Kierkegaard. After it, almost every French intellectual did.

References

1938 non-fiction books
Philosophy books
Books about Søren Kierkegaard
French philosophy